The 2006 Campeonato Paulista de Futebol Profissional da Primeira Divisão - Série A1 was the 105th season of São Paulo's top professional football league. Santos were the champions, winning for the 16th time.

League table

Top scorers

Source: Terra

See also
 Copa Paulista de Futebol
 Campeonato Paulista Série A2
 Campeonato Paulista Série A3
 Campeonato Paulista Segunda Divisão

References

Campeonato Paulista seasons
Paulista